Reuben Garrick (born 30 June 1997) is an Australian rugby league footballer who plays as a er and fullback for the Manly Warringah Sea Eagles in the NRL.

He has played at representative level for the Prime Minister's XIII and for Australia 9s at the 2019 Rugby League World Cup 9s tournament.

Background
Garrick was born in Sydney, New South Wales, Australia.

He played his junior rugby league for the Gerringong Lions.

Prior to playing in the NRL, Garrick played Under 20’s and NSW Cup for the St. George Illawarra Dragons.  During the 2018 season, Garrick signed a contract with Manly starting in 2019.

Career

2019
Prior to playing in the NRL, Garrick played Under 20’s and NSW Cup for the St. George Illawarra Dragons.  During the 2018 season, Garrick signed a contract with Manly starting in 2019.
Garrick made his first grade debut in Round 1 of the 2019 NRL season against the Wests Tigers.
In Round 8 2019, Garrick scored all of Manly's 18 points as they defeated Canterbury-Bankstown 18-10 at Brookvale Oval.  In the same week, Garrick signed a contract to stay with Manly until the end of the 2021 season.

In Round 18 2019 against Parramatta, Garrick scored a hat-trick as Manly-Warringah won the match 36-24 at Brookvale Oval.
In Round 20 2019 against Newcastle, Garrick scored 2 tries and kicked 3 goals as Manly won the match 30-6 at Brookvale Oval.

In Round 21 2019, Garrick scored 2 tries for Manly-Warringah in a 24-16 loss against the New Zealand Warriors at Mt. Smart Stadium.

Garrick finished the 2019 NRL season as Manly's top try scorer and top point scorer.  The club would go on to reach the second week of the finals but were eliminated in the semi-final by South Sydney.

On 30 September, Garrick earned his first representative jersey as he was named on the bench for the Australia PM XIII side against Fiji PM XIII, which he scored his first representative try in the 10-52 demolishing of Fiji at ANZ National stadium in Fiji. On 7 October, Garrick was named in the Australian side for the 2019 Rugby League World Cup 9s. Later that day, Garrick was named at wing for the U23 Junior Australian side, and on 25 October, he kicked two goals in the 62-4 win against France at WIN stadium.

2020
In round 15 of the 2020 NRL season, Garrick scored two tries and kicked two goals in a 56-16 loss against South Sydney at ANZ Stadium.

Garrick played 17 games for Manly-Warringah in the 2020 NRL season as they finished a disappointing 13th on the table.  He had a difficult second season in the NRL but managed to finish as Manly's top point scorer.

2021
In round 6 of the 2021 NRL season, Garrick scored two tries and kicked six goals in Manly's 36-0 victory over the Gold Coast.

In round 7, Garrick scored one try and kicked six goals for Manly in a 40-6 victory over the Wests Tigers.

In round 14 against North Queensland, Garrick scored a try and kicked seven goals as Manly won the match 50-18.

The following week, Garrick scored four tries for Manly in a 56-24 victory over the Gold Coast.

In round 16 against Canterbury, Garrick equalled the club record for most points scored by a Manly player in a game with 30 points, scoring two tries and kicking 11 goals in a 66-0 victory.
In round 21, Garrick scored two tries in Manly's 28-18 loss against Melbourne.

In round 22, Garrick scored a hat-trick in Manly's 56-10 victory over Parramatta.

In round 24, Garrick became the first player in NRL history to score 20 tries and kick 100 goals in a season during Manly's victory over Wooden Spooners Canterbury.

In round 25, Garrick overtook Hazem El Masri's record for most points by a player during a regular NRL season in Manly's 46-18 victory over North Queensland.

In the 2021 Finals Series, Garrick scored two tries for Manly in a 36-16 loss against South Sydney in the preliminary final.

Rueben Garrick won the 2021 Steve Menzies Medal for the Play of the Year for his outstanding effort that led to the NRL Try of the Year award against North Queensland in Townsville in round 25.
On 27 September, Garrick was named Dally M Winger of the year.

2022
In round 9 of the 2022 NRL season, Garrick scored two tries and kicked four goals in a 36-22 victory over the Wests Tigers.
In round 11, Garrick scored two tries and kicked two goals in Manly's 22-20 loss against Parramatta.
In round 13, Garrick scored two tries and kicked eight goals for Manly in a 44-12 victory over the New Zealand Warriors. Garrick finished as both the clubs top try scorer and point scorer in 2022.

References

External links
Sea Eagles profile

1997 births
Living people
Australian rugby league players
Manly Warringah Sea Eagles players
Rugby league centres
Rugby league players from Sydney